Toso is a surname from Northern Italy, mainly Genoa and Veneto

Notable people with the surname include:
 Ana Maria Toso, Italian paralympic athlete
 Dino Toso, Italian-Dutch motorsport engineer
 Giacinta Toso, Italian opera singer
 Giovanni Pietro dal Toso, secretary of the Pontifical Council “Cor unum”
 Leanne del Toso, paralympic wheelchair basketball player
 Luca Toso, Italian athletics competitor
 Mario Toso, Italian titular bishop
 Otello Toso, Italian film and stage actor

Aristocracy 
 Gerolamo De Franchi Toso (1522 –1586), 73rd Doge of the Republic of Genoa.
 Federico De Franchi Toso (1560 –1630) 96th Doge of the Republic of Genoa.
 Giacomo De Franchi Toso (1590 –1657) 109th Doge of the Republic of Genoa
 Gerolamo De Franchi Toso (1585 –1668) 111th Doge of the Republic of Genoa
 Federico De Franchi Toso (1642 -1734) 136rd Doge of the Republic of Genoa
 Cesare De Franchi Toso (1666 –1739) 146rd Doge of the Republic of Genoa

Other 
 Barovier & Toso, Italian Venetian glass company that is one of the oldest in world

See also

Tono (name)

Surnames
Italian-language surnames